The La Ponette was a French automobile manufactured from 1909 until 1925.  The very small car builder began production with a single-cylinder 697 cc car which was very similar to a small Renault.  This was followed in 1911 by a four-cylinder 1592 cc Ballot-engined vehicle, which was built until 1920.  A few minor models were also made using various proprietary engines.  The parent company, the Société des Automobiles La Ponette, collapsed in 1925, and the marque ceased production.

References 

Ponette, La